Corticaria is a genus of beetles in the family Latridiidae, containing the following species:

 Corticaria abdominalis Dajoz, 1970
 Corticaria aculeata Johnson, 1977
 Corticaria aequabilis Rücker, 1981
 Corticaria aequalis (Reitter, 1898)
 Corticaria aethiops Grouvelle, 1914
 Corticaria alleni Johnson, 1974
 Corticaria alticola Lindberg, 1953
 Corticaria amplicollis Fall, 1899
 Corticaria amurensis Reitter, 1879
 Corticaria anatolica Johnson, 1989
 Corticaria aphictoides Reitter, 1898
 Corticaria apicalis Fall, 1899
 Corticaria appenhageni Uyttenboogaart, 1930
 Corticaria armata (Mannerheim, 1844)
 Corticaria basilewskyi Dajoz, 1970
 Corticaria bella Redtenbacher, 1849
 Corticaria beloni Reitter, 1889
 Corticaria bengaliensis Rücker, 1978
 Corticaria blackburni Rücker, 1989
 Corticaria brevicornis Fall, 1899
 Corticaria brevilata Rücker, 1978
 Corticaria buddha Johnson, 1977
 Corticaria cameruensis Dajoz, 1980
 Corticaria canaliculata Mannerheim, 1853
 Corticaria canariensis Johnson, 1974
 Corticaria carolina Fall, 1899
 Corticaria clavatula Broun, 1914
 Corticaria cognata Rücker, 1978
 Corticaria columbia Fall, 1899
 Corticaria convexa Reitter, 1881
 Corticaria corsica H. Brisout de Barneville, 1878
 Corticaria cotovillae Otero & Pazos, 1986
 Corticaria crenicollis Mannerheim, 1844
 Corticaria crenulata (Gyllenhal, 1827)
 Corticaria cretica Johnson, 1989
 Corticaria cribricollis Fairmaire, 1863
 Corticaria cucujiformis Reitter, 1880
 Corticaria curtipes Lövendal, 1893
 Corticaria debilis Motschulsky, 1867
 Corticaria decorsei Dajoz, 1970
 Corticaria delgerchangaji Rücker, 1983
 Corticaria dentigera Le Conte, 1855
 Corticaria dentiventris Poppius, 1903
 Corticaria desaegeri Dajoz, 1970
 Corticaria descarpentriesi Dajoz, 1970
 Corticaria diecki Reitter, 1875
 Corticaria dinshuensis Johnson, 1976
 Corticaria distincta Dajoz, 1970
 Corticaria dubia Dajoz, 1970
 Corticaria elgonensis Jeannel & Paulian, 1945
 Corticaria elongata (Gyllenhal, 1827)
 Corticaria espanyoli J.C. Otero & M.J. López, 2009
 Corticaria fagi Wollaston, 1854
 Corticaria fasciata Reitter, 1877
 Corticaria fastigata Rücker, 1978
 Corticaria fennica Johnson, 1974
 Corticaria ferruginea Marsham, 1802
 Corticaria formicaephila Broun, 1893
 Corticaria foveola (Beck, 1817)
 Corticaria franzi Dajoz,
 Corticaria fulva (Comolli, 1837)
 Corticaria fulvoides Johnson, 1989
 Corticaria garambae Dajoz, 1970
 Corticaria geisha Johnson, 1989
 Corticaria globicollis Rücker, 1989
 Corticaria gracilis Mannerheim, 1844
 Corticaria helios Rücker, 2006
 Corticaria hierroensis Johnson, 1985
 Corticaria humilis Sharp, 1902
 Corticaria ikarus Rücker, 2006
 Corticaria illaesa Mannerheim, 1844
 Corticaria impressa (Olivier, 1790)
 Corticaria incerta Fall, 1899
 Corticaria inconspicua Wollaston, 1860
 Corticaria inflatipennis Champion, 1922
 Corticaria inopia Fall, 1899
 Corticaria interstitialis Mannerheim, 1844
 Corticaria jaegeri Reike, 2006
 Corticaria japonica Reitter, 1877
 Corticaria johnsoni Marino & López & Otero
 Corticaria kabakovi Saluk, 1992
 Corticaria khnzoriani Johnson, 1989
 Corticaria laertes Rücker, 2006
 Corticaria langa Dajoz, 1979
 Corticaria lapponica (Zetterstedt, 1838)
 Corticaria lata Reike, 2010
 Corticaria lateritia Mannerheim, 1844
 Corticaria latulipennis Broun, 1914
 Corticaria leileri Johnson, 1985
 Corticaria lindensis Blackburn, 1891
 Corticaria lineatoserrata Johnson, 1976
 Corticaria lisae Reike, 2010
 Corticaria longicollis (Zetterstedt, 1838)
 Corticaria longicornis (Herbst, 1783)
 Corticaria luchti Rücker, 1985
 Corticaria maculosa lineata Johnson, 1974
 Corticaria maculosa maculosa Wollaston, 1858
 Corticaria magadanica Tsinkevich, 2001
 Corticaria martensi Johnson, 1977
 Corticaria mirabilis Dajoz, 1971
 Corticaria mongolica Rücker, 1983
 Corticaria nebulosa Champion, 1922
 Corticaria nigerrima Dajoz, 1970
 Corticaria obscura C. Brisout de Barneville, 1863
 Corticaria obsoleta Strand, 1940
 Corticaria occidua Fall, 1899
 Corticaria olympiaca Reitter, 1875
 Corticaria orbicollis (Mannerheim, 1853)
 Corticaria orientalis Champion, 1922
 Corticaria ornata Reitter, 1877
 Corticaria ovalipennis Rücker, 1989
 Corticaria ovicollis Reitter, 1887
 Corticaria ovipennis Reitter, 1887
 Corticaria parallela Fall, 1899
 Corticaria parvithorax Champion, 1922
 Corticaria peezi Johnson, 2007
 Corticaria pharaonis Motschulsky, 1867
 Corticaria picicornis Broun, 1914
 Corticaria pilosula Rosenhauer, 1856
 Corticaria pineti Lohse, 1960
 Corticaria pinicola C. Brisout de Barneville, 1866
 Corticaria planula Fall, 1899
 Corticaria poculifera Fall, 1899
 Corticaria polypori Sahlberg, 1900
 Corticaria porochini Johnson, 2007
 Corticaria poseidon Rücker, 2006
 Corticaria prionodera Le Conte, 1855
 Corticaria pubescens (Gyllenhal, 1827)
 Corticaria punctata Dajoz, 1970
 Corticaria punctulata Marsham, 1802
 Corticaria quadrimaculata Mannerheim, 1844
 Corticaria relicta Johnson, 1977
 Corticaria rhombifera Champion, 1922
 Corticaria rotundipennis Johnson, 1977
 Corticaria rubripes Mannerheim, 1844
 Corticaria rudis Fall, 1899
 Corticaria rueckeri J. C. Otero, P. Marino & M. J. López
 Corticaria rufa Johnson, 1976
 Corticaria rugipennis Reitter, 1881
 Corticaria ruwenzoriae Dajoz, 1970
 Corticaria saginata Mannerheim, 1844
 Corticaria salpingoides Motschulsky, 1867
 Corticaria serrata (Paykull, 1798)
 Corticaria serricollis Le Conte, 1855
 Corticaria spinulosa Mannerheim, 1852
 Corticaria strandi Roubal, 1934
 Corticaria striatopunctata Motschulsky, 1867
 Corticaria subamurensis Saluk, 1992
 Corticaria subpilosula Reitter, 1898
 Corticaria subtilissima Reitter, 1877
 Corticaria suspecta Johnson, 1989
 Corticaria sylvicola C. Brisout de Barneville, 1863
 Corticaria tarragonensis Dajoz, 1970
 Corticaria temporalis Fall, 1899
 Corticaria tenuipes Fall, 1899
 Corticaria thea Reitter, 1894
 Corticaria thomsoni Reitter, 1880
 Corticaria topali Rücker, 1978
 Corticaria transvalensis Dajoz, 1970
 Corticaria tuberculata Dajoz, 1970
 Corticaria tunisiensis H. Brisout de Barneville, 1884
 Corticaria umbilicata (Beck, 1817)
 Corticaria unca Reike, 2010
 Corticaria valida Fall, 1899
 Corticaria varicolor Fall, 1899
 Corticaria vestigia Rücker, 1981

References

Latridiidae genera